Las golondrinas is a zarzuela by José María Usandizaga. The libretto was written by Gregorio Martínez Sierra and María Lejárraga.

Las golondrinas premiered on February 5, 1914, at the Teatro Circo Price in Madrid.

References

Compositions by José María Usandizaga
Zarzuelas
1914 operas
Operas